Jephcott is a surname. Notable people with the surname include: 

 Alfred Jephcott (1853–1932), English trade unionist and politician
 Sir Harry Jephcott (1891–1978), English pharmaceutical industrialist
 Avun Jephcott (born 1983), English footballer
 Claude Jephcott, English footballer
 Dominic Jephcott (born 1957), English actor

See also 
 Jephcott Baronets